Rui José Lopes (born 6 March 1960) is a retired Bissau-Guinean footballer who played as a forward.

References

1960 births
Living people
Association football forwards
Bissau-Guinean footballers
Bissau-Guinean expatriate footballers
Amarante F.C. players
Rio Ave F.C. players
Leixões S.C. players
F.C. Famalicão players
AD Fafe players
R.D. Águeda players
Leça F.C. players
F.C. Felgueiras players
S.C. Lamego players
C.D. Trofense players